A midibus is a classification of single-decker minibuses which are generally larger than a traditional minibus but smaller than a full-size single decker and can be anywhere between  and  long. While used in many parts of the world, the midibus is perhaps most common in the United Kingdom, where operators have found them more economical, and to have a sufficient number of seats compared to full size single-decker buses.

Midibuses are often designed to be lightweight to save on diesel fuel (e.g. smaller wheels than on larger buses), making them not as durable as heavier 'full size' buses. Some midibuses, such as the Scania OmniTown, are heavier and therefore more durable.
In some places such as Hong Kong, some bus routes have to be served by midibuses due to the winding roads along such routes.

United States designs
The term "midibus" is not in common use in the United States, such smaller and lighter-duty buses not being employed in public transit roles there except in some very specialized instances. For example, Muni in San Francisco operates both  and  versions of the Orion VII transit bus to serve routes that include some of the steeper and curvier hills.

In charter / tour roles, there is indeed a gap between the minibus (12-28 seats) and the touring coach (47-50 seats). Several shuttle bus companies such as Goshen Coach and Crystal have manufactured rear-engined vehicles that have 30–35 seats, but no generic term has ever been applied to them. They are usually lumped together with their smaller "minibus" brethren and called "minibus", or "shuttle bus". Examples of these include the TEMSA TS 30/TS 35 and the MCI J3500.

In the 2000s, some manufacturers introduced mid-sized bus models based on large truck frames.

Models

Alexander Dennis Enviro200 MMC
Gillig Low Floor (29 and 35 ft variants)
New Flyer Xcelsior (35 ft variants)
ARBOC Specialty Vehicles
BYD Auto K7/K7M
Thomas Built Buses Saf-T-Liner HDX (25, 30, 35 ft variants)
Agrale MT12 (chassis)
Autosan Sancity 9 LE
Autosan Sancity 10LF - (Low floor integral)
Albion Nimbus - from 1955–65
Bedford VAS - From 1961-87
Bedford JJL - an early unsuccessful attempt at a purpose built midibus 1975-81
Bristol SU - 1960-6
Chance Coach/Optima Opus
Daewoo BS090 Royal-Midi
Daewoo BC095
Dennis Domino
Dennis Dart (chassis)
Dennis/Transbus/Alexander Dennis Dart SLF (chassis)
Alexander Dennis Enviro200 Dart - also manufactured and marketed in North America by New Flyer Industries as the New Flyer MiDi
ElDorado EZ Rider II MAX/BRT
FAP A-402
Grande West Vicinity
Hino Melpha
Hino Rainbow
Heuliez GX117
Heuliez GX127
Hyundai Aero Town
Hyundai Global 900
Hyundai GreenCity
Mercedes-Benz Trekka
Ikarus 405
Ikarus E91
Ikarbus ik-107
Irisbus Citelis 10
Isuzu Erga Mio
Isuzu Gala Mio
Isuzu Journey-K
Isuzu Novo
Isuzu Turquoise
Iveco EuroMidi

Kravtex Credo EN9,5
Leyland Swift
MAN 10.xxx HOCL/MAN 11.xxx HOCL (chassis)
MAN 12.xxx HOCL/MAN 12.xxx HOCL-NL (chassis)
MAN 13.xxx HOCL (chassis)
MAN 14.xxx HOCL/MAN 14.xxx HOCL-NL (chassis)
MAN Lion's City M
MAZ-206
MAZ-256
MCW Metrorider
Marshall Minibus
Mercedes-Benz O520 Cito
Mercedes-Benz O530K (Citaro K)
Mercedes-Benz OH1115LSB (chassis)
Mitsubishi Fuso Aero Midi MJ/MK/Aero Midi-S
New Flyer Industries D30LF / 35LF
Neoplan Centroliner
Nissan Diesel Space Runner JP
Nissan Diesel Space Runner RM
Nissan Diesel RB80 (chassis)
Optare Excel
Optare MetroRider
Optare Solo
Optare Solo SR
Optare Versa
Otokar Navigo/Sultan
PAZ-3237
PAZ-4230
Scania OmniTown
SOR CN 8.5
Temsa Prestij
Thaco Town TB82S
Thaco Town TB85S
Thaco TB94CT
Thaco Meadow 85S
Thaco Meadow 89CT
VDL SB120
VDL SB180
 Volkswagen Volksbus
Volvo B6/B6LE (chassis)
Volvo B6BLE (chassis)
Wright StreetLite
Ashok Leyland Jan Bus Midi

See also

 Minibus
 List of buses

Buses by type